Travel Time is a Philippine television travel documentary show broadcast by GMA Network. It premiered in 1986. The show is the longest running travel documentary show in the Philippine television. The show concluded on ANC in 2015.

References 

1986 Philippine television series debuts
1980s Philippine television series
2015 Philippine television series endings
ABS-CBN News Channel original programming
English-language television shows
GMA Network original programming
Intercontinental Broadcasting Corporation original programming
Philippine documentary television series
Philippine travel television series
Studio 23 original programming